Brunów may refer to the following places in Poland:
Brunów, Lwówek Śląski County
Brunów, Polkowice County

See also
 Brunow, Germany
 Heckelberg-Brunow, Germany
 16590 Brunowalter, an asteroid